FC Odesa was a professional Ukrainian football club based in Odesa. The club plays in blue-white colors. The club originally was called Dnister and played in Ovidiopol but after the 2010–11 season the club moved to Odesa.

History

The first football team in Ovidiopol was established in 1947. There was an amateur team, called "Dzerzhinets", which played in the local competitions of the Odesa Oblast and Ukraine. Amateur Ovidiopol team became Odesa Oblast champions in 1980. Professional football club was created in 1992 based on the amateur team – shortly after Soviet Union breakup in 1991. The team played in the amateur Ukrainian championship in 1998 and won it in 1999. Since 2001 Dnister has played in the professional leagues of Ukrainian football. In 2008 the new ownership of the club was announcing about its plans to build a new stadium for Dnister.

During the 2010–11 season Dniester started playing their home games in Odesa due to the unsafe state of their stadium (Viktor Dukov) in Ovidiopol. With the inability to secure finances to repair the stadium the club opted to move their head office to Odesa after the season.

The club was relegated from Ukrainian First League after the 2012–13 season after losing a promotion/relegation playoff to Nyva Ternopil. The club withdrew from the PFL prior to the 2013–14 season.

Honors
Ukrainian Druha Liha: 1
 2005/06 Champions Group A

League and cup history

Dnister Ovidiopol
{|class="wikitable"
|-bgcolor="#efefef"
! Season
! Div.
! Pos.
! Pl.
! W
! D
! L
! GS
! GA
! P
!Domestic Cup
!colspan=2|Europe
!Notes
|-
|align=center|2001–02
|align=center|3rd "B"
|align=center|5
|align=center|34
|align=center|16
|align=center|9
|align=center|9
|align=center|44
|align=center|27
|align=center|57
|align=center|Did not enter
|align=center|
|align=center|
|align=center|
|-
|align=center|2002–03
|align=center|3rd "B"
|align=center|5
|align=center|30
|align=center|14
|align=center|5
|align=center|11
|align=center|27
|align=center|23
|align=center|47
|align=center|1/16 finals
|align=center|
|align=center|
|align=center|
|-
|align=center|2003–04
|align=center|3rd "B"
|align=center|4
|align=center|30
|align=center|16
|align=center|7
|align=center|7
|align=center|38
|align=center|23
|align=center|55
|align=center|1/32 finals
|align=center|
|align=center|
|align=center|
|-
|align=center|2004–05
|align=center|3rd "B"
|align=center|10
|align=center|26
|align=center|9
|align=center|4
|align=center|13
|align=center|33
|align=center|37
|align=center|33
|align=center|1/32 finals
|align=center|
|align=center|
|align=center|
|-
|align=center|2005–06
|align=center|3rd "B"
|align=center|8
|align=center|28
|align=center|10
|align=center|8
|align=center|10
|align=center|28
|align=center|27
|align=center|38
|align=center|1/32 finals
|align=center|
|align=center|
|align=center|
|-
|align=center|2006–07
|align=center|3rd "A"
|align=center bgcolor=gold|1
|align=center|28
|align=center|18
|align=center|8
|align=center|2
|align=center|44
|align=center|12
|align=center|62
|align=center|1/32 finals
|align=center|
|align=center|
|align=center bgcolor=green|Promoted
|-
|align=center|2007–08
|align=center|2nd
|align=center|12
|align=center|38
|align=center|12
|align=center|13
|align=center|13
|align=center|33
|align=center|39
|align=center|49
|align=center|1/8 finals
|align=center|
|align=center|
|align=center|
|-
|align=center|2008–09
|align=center|2nd
|align=center|9
|align=center|32
|align=center|11
|align=center|10
|align=center|11
|align=center|39
|align=center|40
|align=center|43
|align=center|1/16 finals
|align=center|
|align=center|
|align=center|
|-
|align=center|2009–10
|align=center|2nd
|align=center|11
|align=center|34
|align=center|12
|align=center|8
|align=center|14
|align=center|44
|align=center|47
|align=center|44
|align=center|1/16 finals
|align=center|
|align=center|
|align=center|
|-
|align=center|2010–11
|align=center|2nd
|align=center|13
|align=center|34
|align=center|10
|align=center|12
|align=center|12
|align=center|39
|align=center|42
|align=center|42
|align=center|1/32 finals
|align=center|
|align=center|
|align=center|
|}

FC Odesa
{|class="wikitable"
|-bgcolor="#efefef"
! Season
! Div.
! Pos.
! Pl.
! W
! D
! L
! GS
! GA
! P
!Domestic Cup
!colspan=2|Europe
!Notes
|-
|align=center|2011–12
|align=center|2nd
|align=center|15
|align=center|34
|align=center|7
|align=center|10
|align=center|17
|align=center|37
|align=center|51
|align=center|31
|align=center|1/32 finals
|align=center|
|align=center|
|align=center|
|-
|align=center|2012–13
|align=center|2nd
|align=center|16
|align=center|34 	
|align=center|7 	
|align=center|3 	
|align=center|24 	
|align=center|21 	
|align=center|63 	
|align=center|24
|align=center|1/16 finals
|align=center|
|align=center|
|align=center bgcolor=pink|Relegated – Withdrew
|}

Head coaches (Managers)
 1997–2007 Vasyl Ushchapovskyi (father of Andriy Ushchapovskyi)
 2001–2003 Viktor Hryshko
 2007–2008 Ihor Nehara (former manager of Chornomorochka and Chornomorets-2)
 2008 Vladyslav Zubkov (interim)
 2008 Timerlan Huseinov (interim)
 2008–2013 Andriy Parkhomenko

Presidents
 ?–2000 unknown
 2000–2007 Khasan Khasaiev
 2007–2013 Andrei Prodaievich

References

External links
  Official website
 Football. Andrei Prodaievich: "FC Odesa made a step back to move forward two (Футбол. Андрей ПРОДАЕВИЧ: «ФК «Одесса» сделал шаг назад, чтобы сделать два вперед»). Odesa Sport. 16 July 2013
 Andrei Prodaievich: "The main task of "Dnestr is to save the distinctive club for the region (Андрей Продаевич: "Основная задача "Днестра" - сохранить самобытный клуб для региона"). Professional Football League. 1 December 2010
 The news of the day! "Dnestr" is disappearing to be transformed into FC "Odesa" (Новость дня! “Днестр” исчезает, чтобы превратиться в ФК “Одесса”). Odesskaya Zhizn. 21 June 2011 / On the Ukrainian football map appeared a new football club "Odesa" (На футбольной карте Украины появился новый футбольный клуб - «Одесса»). Odesa Media. 28 July 2011
 In Odesa was established a new football federation (В Одессе создали новую федерацию футбола). Dumskaya. 23 December 2017
 Who in Odesa will risk to settle with the honorary consul of Kazakhstan (Кто в Одессе рискнет разобраться с почетным консулом Казахстана). Novosti Odessy. 25 May. accessed 18 July 2020 / Prodaievich Clan: The Russian Mir and the Tsar's hunting (Клан Продаевичей: русский мир и царская охота (ФОТО)). ORD.
 The Virgin Islands supply with coal local budget-held institutions of Odesa Oblast (Виргинские острова снабжают углем бюджетные учреждения Одесской области ). Izbirkom. 14 December 2016

FC Dnister Ovidiopol
Odessa
Odessa, FC
Association football clubs established in 2011
Association football clubs disestablished in 2013
2011 establishments in Ukraine
2013 disestablishments in Ukraine